Noel Melissa Trépanier (born November 30, 1974) is a former Canadian soccer player.

Playing career
Trépanier attended the University of Ottawa, making the women's soccer team as a walk-on in 1994. She helped lead the team to the 1996 national championship and was a two-time All-Canadian. After departing the school after her fourth year in 1997, she returned in 2000 for her final season of eligibility. That season in 2000, she won the Chantal Navert Memorial Award as Canadian University sport MVP and a first-team All-Canadian. In 2000, they won the OUA provincial title and came in 2nd at the national tournament.

In 1997 and 1998, she won the Ontario Cup with Nepean United Spirit. In 1999, she won the Ontario Cup with the South Nepean United Spirits (who eventually merged with another club to form Ottawa South United in 2003). In 2006, she won the Ontario Cup with the Ottawa Royals.

In 2001 and 2002, Trépanier played for the Ottawa Fury of the USL W-League.

International career
Trépanier was named to the Canada national team for the 2001 and 2002 Algarve Cups. She made her debut on March 11, 2001 against the United States.

References

1974 births
Living people
Canada women's international soccer players
Canadian women's soccer players
People from Leamington, Ontario
Soccer people from Ontario
USL W-League (1995–2015) players
University of Ottawa alumni
Women's association football defenders
Ottawa Fury (women) players